Laurel Run is a  tributary stream of Georges Creek in Allegany County, Maryland.

Laurel Run Road crosses Laurel Run on a steel girder bridge with open grating, constructed in 1955 and rebuilt in 2002.

References

 United States Geological Survey. Reston, VA. "Laurel Run." Geographic Names Information System (GNIS). Accessed 2010-06-06.

Rivers of Allegany County, Maryland
Rivers of Maryland
Tributaries of the Potomac River